Clément Novalak (born 23 December 2000) is a French-Swiss racing driver currently racing for Trident in the 2023 Formula 2 Championship, having previously drove for MP Motorsport. He previously raced in the FIA Formula Three Championship for Carlin and Trident and won the 2019 British F3 Championship with Carlin.

Career

Karting 
Novalak started karting in France when he was 10 years old. He won a couple of championships, his first of which was in 2015 at the WSK Super Master Series. He competed all around Europe including France, Sweden, Italy and the UK. In 2014, Novalak received backing from former karting champion and Hitech Grand Prix founder Oliver Oakes.

Toyota Racing Series 
In 2018, Novalak made his single-seater debut in the championship with Giles Motorsport. Claiming two wins at Teretonga and Hampton Downs saw him end the season fifth and as top rookie.

Formula Renault Eurocup 
Following his performance in the Toyota Racing Series, Novalak was signed to Josef Kaufmann Racing for the 2018 season.

British Formula 3 
Novalak's first season in British F3 was in 2018 with Carlin. The first race of the season he took pole at Oulton Park, however he would retire from the race. Novalak competed in 4 of the 8 rounds in that season with the best finish being 4th, he finished the season in 18th with 120 points, only two points behind the swede Arvin Esmaeili who had a full-time drive.

In 2019 Novalak got a full-time drive with Carlin. He got two poles and two wins, in the second race of the final round of the season himself and championship rival Johnathan Hoggard collided meaning they both finished at the bottom end of the points. Hoggard finished 15th whereas Novalak finished 12th which gave him 4 points, enough to win him the title despite Hoggard winning the final race.

FIA Formula 3 Championship

2020 
Following his British F3 title win, Novalak joined Carlin for the second and third days of the post-season test at Valencia. In February 2020, Novalak was named as part of Carlin's lineup for the 2020 season, which includes him, Cameron Das and Enaam Ahmed. He scored his first podium in Austria.

2021 

In the post-season test at Catalunya, Novalak joined the Trident outfit and set the fastest time of the second day's morning session. He ended up signing with the team for the 2021 season, driving alongside Jack Doohan and David Schumacher. At the first round in Barcelona, Novalak scored his first podium of the year in Sprint Race 1, finishing second, and would add to his points tally in the remaining two races of the weekend. More points came in all three races at his home circuit, Le Castellet, despite which Novalak commented that consistency was "not good enough" for a title battle. Bad luck befell him in the third event at the Red Bull Ring, where the Frenchman collided with Matteo Nannini whilst battling for the lead in the closing stages of the first sprint race. Another crash, this time caused by Arthur Leclerc, forced Novalak out of the feature race, meaning that he wouldn't score points that round.

At the next two rounds in Budapest and Spa, Novalak scored points in all six races, even managing to set the fastest lap in Sprint Race 2 in the latter event. This would be followed up by a double podium at Zandvoort, with Novalak profiting from a collision between his teammate Schumacher and Victor Martins to take second on Sunday. At the season finale in Sochi, Novalak was embroiled in a battle for the lead with teammate Doohan, as the Australian ignored his team's instructions to let Novalak past, which meant that Doohan won the race, whilst Novalak had to settle for third, having been overtaken by Frederik Vesti near the end of the race. Despite this, Novalak, who ended up third in the drivers' championship, had helped Trident to take the teams' title.

FIA Formula 2 Championship

2021 
During November 2021, MP Motorsport announced that Novalak would replace Lirim Zendeli for the final 2 races of the 2021 season and contest the full season with them in 2022. His best finish ended up being 14th, which he achieved in three separate races.

2022 
For the 2022 season, Novalak would be partnered by Felipe Drugovich. The Frenchman started his season out slowly, having to wait until the round at Imola for his first points in the category. More points would follow in Barcelona, where Novalak took fifth place in the feature race, although this would be his final top-ten finish for the subsequent four rounds. After the summer break, Novalak scored his only podium of the year, finishing second in the sprint race at Zandvoort. He ended his season 14th in the drivers' standings, helping MP to win the teams' title.

2023 
Shortly before the 2022 post-season testing, Novalak was announced to be reuniting with Trident for the 2023 season. His teammate will be czech rookie Roman Staněk.

Formula One 
In 2017, Novalak partook in an assessment with the Ferrari Driver Academy.

Personal life 
Novalak was born in the French city of Avignon to a French father and Swiss mother. He moved to Montreux in Switzerland as a child and again to Hertfordshire in the United Kingdom in his teens. He claimed in a 2020 interview that, similar to Bertrand Gachot, "...I would probably consider myself European nowadays." In 2021, he raced under a French license as he stated that his "origins are French" and despite him "[not having] lived there a lot [he] was born there and each time [he] took a train or a plane in France, [he felt] at home."

Novalak's father, who had introduced him to motorsport, died in 2017, as a result of which the Frenchman added his father's birthday to his helmet in Roman numerals.

Karting record

Karting career summary

Racing record

Racing career summary

† As Novalak was a guest driver, he was ineligible for points.

Complete Toyota Racing Series results 
(key) (Races in bold indicate pole position) (Races in italics indicate fastest lap)

Complete Formula Renault Eurocup results 
(key) (Races in bold indicate pole position) (Races in italics indicate fastest lap)

Complete BRDC British Formula 3 Championship results 
(key) (Races in bold indicate pole position) (Races in italics indicate fastest lap)

Complete FIA Formula 3 Championship results 
(key) (Races in bold indicate pole position points; races in italics indicate points for the fastest lap of top ten finishers)

Complete FIA Formula 2 Championship results 
(key) (Races in bold indicate pole position) (Races in italics indicate points for the fastest lap of top ten finishers)

* Season still in progress.

References

External links 
 
 

2000 births
Living people
French racing drivers
BRDC British Formula 3 Championship drivers
Formula Renault Eurocup drivers
FIA Formula 3 Championship drivers
Sportspeople from Avignon
Josef Kaufmann Racing drivers
Carlin racing drivers
Trident Racing drivers
MP Motorsport drivers
FIA Formula 2 Championship drivers
French people of Swiss descent
Sportspeople from Vaucluse
Toyota Racing Series drivers
Karting World Championship drivers
French expatriate sportspeople in England